Dame Lyn Susan Chitty  is a British physician and Professor of Genetics and Fetal Medicine at University College London. She is the deputy director of the National Institute for Health and Care Research Great Ormond Street Hospital Biomedical Research Centre. She is the 2022 president of the International Society for Prenatal Diagnosis. Her research considers non-invasive prenatal diagnostics. She was made a Dame in the 2022 New Year Honours.

Early life and education 
Chitty earned her medical degree at the University of London.

Research and career 
Chitty's interest is in prenatal genetic diagnostics and ultrasound screening of fatal skeletal abnormalities, enabling parents to find out about the health of their unborn children. She was appointed a Chair the Great Ormond Street Hospital in 2009.

Noninvasive prenatal testing (NIPT) for conditions such as Down syndrome was made available through commercial providers in the United States and China in 2011, and in the United Kingdom by 2014. Chitty led the National Institute for Health and Care Research RAPID (Reliable, Accurate Prenatal, non-Invasive Diagnosis) programme, which looked to investigate all aspects of non-invasive testing and evaluate how it could be incorporated into the National Health Service. She showed that implementing noninvasive prenatal testing to the NHS was cost-neutral, and reduced the number of women who needed an invasive test to confirm a high-risk result.

Chitty recruited one third of the rare diseases participants to the 100,000 genome project. She helped members of the public understand genomics and genomic sequencing. At GOSH she worked with young people to understand public health and genomics. She has argued that the lives of cancer patients will be transformed with genomic testing.

In 2020, she was made President of the International Society for Prenatal Diagnosis. She was elected Dame of the British Empire in 2022.

Select publications

References 

Year of birth missing (living people)
Place of birth missing (living people)
British geneticists 
Dames Commander of the Order of the British Empire
Alumni of the UCL Medical School
Living people
British women geneticists
20th-century British medical doctors
21st-century British medical doctors
20th-century British women scientists
21st-century British women scientists
20th-century women physicians
21st-century women physicians
British women medical doctors
Physicians of Great Ormond Street Hospital